15 Years on Death Row is a compilation album released by Death Row Records and Koch Records on December 26, 2006. The release features several notable Death Row artists such as Snoop Dogg, Dr. Dre, 2Pac, Nate Dogg, Daz Dillinger, and The Lady Of Rage. A music video DVD is included. The double album includes "G'z Up, Hoes Down", a Track from Snoop Dogg's Doggystyle album that was removed for sample clearance issues.

Track listing

Disc One

Disc Two

Music Videos
1. Dr. Dre – Dre Day
2. Dr. Dre – Nuthin' but a "G" Thang
3. Dr. Dre – Let Me Ride
4. Dr. Dre – Lil' Ghetto Boy
5. Dr. Dre & Ice Cube – Natural Born Killaz
6. Snoop Dogg – Who Am I (What's My Name)?
7. Snoop Dogg – Gin and Juice (Laid Back Mx)
8. Snoop Dogg – Doggy Dogg World
9. Snoop Dogg – Vapors
10. Snoop Dogg – Murder Was The Case
11. Snoop Dogg – Doggfather
12. Snoop Dogg – Snoop's Upside Ya Head
13. Warren G – Regulate
14. The Lady of Rage – Afro Puffs
15. 2Pac – How Do U Want It
16. 2Pac – All About U
17. 2Pac – California Love (Original Version)
18. 2Pac – California Love (Remix Version)
19. 2Pac – I Ain't Mad at Cha
20. 2Pac – Hit 'Em Up
21. 2Pac – Made Niggaz
22. 2Pac – To Live & Die in L.A.
23. 2Pac – Toss It Up
24. 2Pac – Hail Mary

Record label compilation albums
Hip hop compilation albums
2006 compilation albums
Death Row Records compilation albums
Albums produced by Daz Dillinger
Albums produced by Dr. Dre
Albums produced by Quincy Jones III
Albums produced by Sam Sneed
Albums produced by Suge Knight
Music video compilation albums
2006 video albums
Death Row Records video albums
Hip hop video albums
Gangsta rap compilation albums
G-funk compilation albums